Dorothy V. McClendon (December 21, 1924 – May 17, 2013) was an American microbiologist.

Early life and education
McClenden was born in Minden, Louisiana on December 21, 1924 She moved from Minden to Detroit, Michigan with her mother and older sister Melba. With her mother's encouragement, McClendon applied and was accepted to the competitive Cass Technical High School. She then attended A & I State University (now Tennessee State University) in Tennessee, where she earned a BSc in biology in 1948. She original planned to pursue a medical career, but became interested in microbiology. At Tennessee A&I, McClendon held leadership roles in the Alpha Chi chapter of Delta Sigma Theta sorority and the Sunday School Cabinet. After post-graduate study at universities including Purdue, Wayne State, and the University of Detroit, she briefly taught in public schools in Phoenix, Arizona and Eldorado, Arkansas.

Career 
McClenden joined TACOM in the 1952. During her long career, she focused on developing methods to protect stored goods, notably fuel, from degradation due to biological agents. She retired in 1984.

Personal life 
McClendon never married. She volunteered with youth ministries, Sunday schools, and scholarship programs through local Christian schools and organizations.

She died in Kansas on May 17, 2013, at the age of 88.

References

1924 births
2013 deaths
Cass Technical High School alumni
Tennessee State University alumni